Moussa N'Diaye (born 18 June 2002) is a Senegalese professional footballer who plays as a defender for Belgian First Division A club Anderlecht.

Club career
In 2020, N'Diaye signed for Spanish third tier side Barcelona Atlètic. In 2022, he signed for Anderlecht in the Belgian top flight.

International career
N'Diaye represented the Senegal under-20 team at the 2019 Africa U-20 Cup of Nations and 2019 FIFA U-20 World Cup. In November 2022, he was called up to the Senegal senior team for the 2022 FIFA World Cup in Qatar, replacing the injured Sadio Mané in the squad.

Career statistics

Club

References

External links
 

2002 births
Living people
Footballers from Dakar
Senegalese footballers
Senegal youth international footballers
Association football defenders
Aspire Academy (Senegal) players
FC Barcelona Atlètic players
R.S.C. Anderlecht players
RSCA Futures players
Primera Federación players
Belgian Pro League players
Challenger Pro League players
2022 FIFA World Cup players
Senegalese expatriate footballers
Senegalese expatriate sportspeople in Spain
Expatriate footballers in Spain
Senegalese expatriate sportspeople in Belgium
Expatriate footballers in Belgium